Shalom Park is a retirement community located in Aurora, Colorado. Established in 1992, the campus features social, residential and health services for seniors and their families. The  site features the Shalom Park nursing home and the J. Leonard Levy Family Wellness Center. The organization relies on the support of donors to stay financed.

References

External links
Official website

Geography of Aurora, Colorado
Jews and Judaism in Colorado